The 2000 Southern Miss Golden Eagles football team represented the University of Southern Mississippi in the 2000 NCAA Division I-A football season. The Golden Eagles were led by head coach Jeff Bower and played their home games at M. M. Roberts Stadium. They were a member of Conference USA. 

For the second time in three years, the Golden Eagles earned a preseason top 25 ranking, coming in at No. 23. Despite a season-opening loss to 13th-ranked Tennessee, the Golden Eagles recovered, winning the next 6 games, with 5 of those wins coming by 21 or more points, including a 21–0 shutout over 15th-ranked Alabama. Following a near-upset on the road against Houston, Southern Miss was ranked 13th in that week's AP poll, the school's highest ranking in nearly 20 years, when they were ranked 9th during the 1981 season. The Golden Eagles win streak ended that week against eventual conference champions Louisville, and they would go onto lose two more games to finish the regular season with a 7–4 record, 4–3 in Conference USA play. Despite the late season struggles, the Golden Eagles earned a trip to the Mobile Alabama Bowl, where they defeated 13th-ranked TCU, 28–21.

Schedule

Roster

Rankings

References

Southern Miss
Southern Miss Golden Eagles football seasons
LendingTree Bowl champion seasons
Southern Miss Golden Eagles football